The Ezero culture, 3300—2700 BC, was a Bronze Age archaeological culture occupying most of present-day Bulgaria. It takes its name from the Tell-settlement of Ezero.

Ezero follows the copper age cultures of the area (Karanovo VI culture, Gumelniţa culture, Kodzadjemen culture, and Varna culture), after a settlement hiatus in Northern Bulgaria.  It bears some relationship to the earlier Cernavodă III culture  to the north. Some settlements were fortified.

The Ezero culture is interpreted  as part of a larger Balkan-Danubian early Bronze Age complex, a horizon reaching from Troy Id-IIc into Central Europe, encompassing the Baden of the Carpathian Basin and the Coţofeni culture of Romania. According to Hermann Parzinger, there are also typological connections to Poliochne IIa-b and Sitagroi IV.

Economy
Agriculture is in evidence, along with domestic livestock. There is evidence of grape cultivation. Metallurgy was practiced.

Interpretation
Within the context of the Kurgan hypothesis, it would represent a fusion of native "Old European culture" and intrusive "Kurgan culture" elements. It could also represent an Anatolian-influenced culture, either coming from Anatolia (in Renfrew's hypothesis), or heading to Asia Minor.

Notes

Sources
 G.Il. Georgiev et al. (eds.), Ezero, rannobronzovoto selishte. Sofii︠a︡ : Izd-vo na Bŭlgarskata akademii︠a︡ na naukite, Arkheologicheski institut 1979 (excavation report of Tell Ezero).

External links
https://web.archive.org/web/20050817120446/http://archaeology.ro/so_cernav_eng.htm

Archaeological cultures of Southeastern Europe
Archaeological cultures in Bulgaria
Bronze Age cultures of Europe
Indo-European archaeological cultures
4th millennium BC